Dehestan, Dehistan or Dahistan is a name shared by many places in Central Asia. It may refer to:
 the homeland of the Dahae, an extinct ancient tribe in what is now Turkmenistan and Iran
 Dehestan (administrative division) ("district" or "county") is a modern administrative subdivision in Iran 
 Dehestan, Afghanistan
 Dehestan, East Azerbaijan, Iran
 Dehestan-e Bala, Iran
 Dehestan-e Pain, Iran
 Dehistan/Mishrian, an archaeological site in Turkmenistan
 an alternate name for Hyrcania